Empire of the East is a novel by Fred Saberhagen published in 1979.

Plot summary
Empire of the East is a novel in which the East rules the West in the far future.

Reception
Dave Langford reviewed Empire of the East for White Dwarf #52, and stated that "Swashbuckling fun, routine plot, boldly unsubtle characters, clever technology-based magic: my only quibble is that according to Book 3's revelations, the atomic dreadnought unearthed in book 1 ought not to have worked."

Colin Greenland reviewed Empire of the East for Imagine magazine, and stated that "Nothing very original here but it is a well-organised yarn that trots along steadily through landscapes full of disdainful demons and enigmatic artifacts of power, not the least of them the legendary Elephant, a slumbering metal beast with '426th ARMORED DIVISION' lettered on its flank ..."

Reviews
Review by Baird Searles (1980) in Isaac Asimov's Science Fiction Magazine, April 1980 
Review by Algis Budrys (1980) in The Magazine of Fantasy & Science Fiction, May 1980 
Review by Joe Sanders (1981) in Locus, #241 February 1981 
Review by Alan Fraser (2004) in Vector 235

References

1979 American novels